J. Searcy Bracewell Jr. (January 19, 1918 – May 13, 2003), was a Texas Democratic politician and founder of the law firm Bracewell LLP, based in Houston. He served as both a member of the Texas House of Representatives and the Texas Senate from Houston. He was the Texas Senate President Pro Tempore in 1957.

A state House member from 1947 to 1949 and a senator from 1949 to 1959, Bracewell wrote bills establishing what later became the M.D. Anderson Cancer Center and the University of Texas Health Science Center Dental School. In 1957, he waged an unsuccessful campaign for the U.S. Senate in a special election against Ralph Yarborough for the right to finish the elected term of then Governor Price Daniel.

In 1945, Bracewell, his father, his brother, and a future state district judge joined to form the precursor of the firm that became Bracewell & Giuliani when former New York City Mayor Rudolph W. Giuliani joined the group in March 2005.

Bracewell served in World War II on the staff of General George S. Patton.  He was president and board chairman of the Houston Grand Opera, interim president of the South Texas College of Law, board chairman of the visitors of Texas A&M University at Galveston. He was named Outstanding Houston Aggie in 1978.

References

External links

1918 births
2003 deaths
South Texas College of Law people
Texas A&M University people
Democratic Party Texas state senators
Democratic Party members of the Texas House of Representatives
People from Houston
20th-century American politicians